In mathematics, real trees (also called -trees) are a class of metric spaces generalising simplicial trees. They arise naturally in many mathematical contexts, in particular geometric group theory and probability theory. They are also the simplest examples of Gromov hyperbolic spaces.

Definition and examples

Formal definition 

A metric space  is a real tree if it is a geodesic space where every triangle is a tripod. That is, for every three points  there exists a point  such that the geodesic segments  intersect in the segment  and also . This definition is equivalent to  being a "zero-hyperbolic space" in the sense of Gromov (all triangles are "zero-thin"). 
Real trees can also be characterised by a topological property.

Simple examples 

If  is a connected graph with the combinatorial metric then it is a real tree if and only if it is a tree (i.e. it has no cycles). Such a tree is often called a simplicial tree.
 The -tree obtained in the following way is nonsimplicial. Start with the interval [0, 2] and glue, for each positive integer n, an interval of length 1/n to the point 1 − 1/n in the original interval. The set of singular points is discrete, but fails to be closed since 1 is an ordinary point in this -tree. Gluing an interval to 1 would result in a closed set of singular points at the expense of discreteness.
 The Paris metric makes the plane into a real tree. Otherwise, their distance is defined to be the sum of the Euclidean distances of these two points to the origin .
 The plane under the Paris metric is an example of a hedgehog space, a collection of line segments joined at a common endpoint. Any such space is a real tree.

Characterizations 

Here are equivalent characterizations of real trees which can be used as definitions:

1) (similar to trees as graphs) A real tree is a geodesic metric space which contains no subset homeomorphic to a circle.

2) A real tree is a connected metric space  which has the four points condition (see figure): 

For all   .

3) A real tree is a connected 0-hyperbolic metric space (see figure). Formally: 

For all   .

4) (similar to the characterization of Galton-Watson trees by the contour process). Consider a positive excursion of a function.

 

  

Then, the quotient space  is a real tree.   Intuitively, the local minima of the excursion e are the parents of the local maxima. Another visual way to construct the real tree from an excursion is to "put glue" under the curve of e, and "bend" this curve, identifying the glued points (see animation).

Examples 

Real trees often appear, in various situations, as limits of more classical metric spaces.

Brownian trees 

A Brownian tree is a (non-simplicial) real tree almost surely. Brownian trees arise as limits of various random processes on finite trees.

Ultralimits of metric spaces 

In particular, the asymptotic cone of any hyperbolic space is a real tree.

Limit of group actions 

Let  be a group. For a sequence of based -spaces  there is a notion of convergence to a based -space  due to M. Bestvina and F. Paulin. When the spaces are hyperbolic and the actions are unbounded the limit (if it exists) is a real tree.

This is useful to produce actions of hyperbolic groups on real trees. Such actions are analyzed using the so-called Rips machine. A case of particular interest is the study of degeneration of groups acting properly discontinuously on a real hyperbolic space (this predates Rips', Bestvina's and Paulin's work and is due to J. Morgan and P. Shalen).

Algebraic groups 

It is simplicial if and only if the valuations is discrete.

Generalisations

-trees 

There is a notion of -tree which recovers simplicial trees when  and real trees when . The structure of finitely presented groups acting freely on -trees was described. In particular, such a group acts freely on some  -tree.

Real buildings 

The axioms for a building can be generalized to give a definition of a real building. These arise for example as asymptotic cones of higher-rank symmetric spaces or as Bruhat-Tits buildings of higher-rank groups over valued fields.

See also
Dendroid (topology)
Tree-graded space

References 

Group theory
Geometry
Topology
Trees (topology)